A Message from Mars may refer to:

 A Message from Mars (1903 film), a New Zealand short film
 A Message from Mars (1913 film), a British science fiction film directed by J. Wallett Waller
 A Message from Mars (1921 film), an American fantasy comedy film directed by Maxwell Karger
 A Message from Mars (play), an 1899 play by Richard Ganthony